Dustin Willms (born 30 June 1999) is a German footballer who plays as a centre-forward for Fortuna Köln.

Career
Willms was born in Werne.

Having played youth football with SV Südkirchen, VfB Waltrop, Schalke 04 and Fortuna Düsseldorf and senior football wth Fortuna Düsseldorf II, he signed for 3. Liga club FSV Zwickau in July 2020.

Career statistics

References

1999 births
Living people
German footballers
People from Werne
Sportspeople from Arnsberg (region)
Footballers from North Rhine-Westphalia
Association football forwards
Fortuna Düsseldorf II players
FSV Zwickau players
SC Fortuna Köln players
Regionalliga players
3. Liga players